Kisse Rahamim yeshivah is an Orthodox yeshivah in Bnei Brak, Israel, which perpetuates the traditions of the Tunisian Jews.  It was founded in Tunis in 1962 and moved to Bnei Brak in 1971. Meir Mazuz, a leading Sephardic Rabbi in Israel, is the dean of the Kisse Rahamim yeshivah.

References

External links
 Official website (in Hebrew)
 Official website (in French)

Jews and Judaism in Tunis
Orthodox yeshivas in Israel
Sephardi Jewish culture in Israel
Sephardic yeshivas
Tunisian-Jewish culture in Israel